Hemdean House School is a mixed, independent, primary and nursery school for children aged 3–11. It is situated in the centre of  Caversham in Reading, Berkshire, England.

Hemdean House School was founded in 1859 by Francis Knighton. In 1862 land was bought for £320, the new building was named Hemdean House. The school operates as a non-profit UK registered charity

The school used to have a girls senior school which was closed in 2016.
The school was listed 29th in the Sunday Times list of 100 best performing independent schools in the UK.

Notable alumni 
 Elsie Smith – nurse and missionary
 Lizbeth Webb – soprano and actress

References

External links 

Profile on the Independent Schools Council website

Private schools in Reading, Berkshire
Educational institutions established in 1859
1859 establishments in the United Kingdom
Member schools of the Independent Schools Association (UK)
Church of England private schools in the Diocese of Oxford